OMS Video is an open, royalty-free video compression specification that was under development by Sun Microsystems's Open Media Commons as part of the Open Media Stack. It defines a video decoder and the associated bitstream syntax. It is intended for delivery, storage and playback of video streams.

It was announced on April 11, 2008. The latest version of OMS Video Specification is 0.91, released on June 9, 2009.

OMS Video design
OMS Video is based on an updated version of the H.261 codec as some of the patents on it have now expired. Vorbis is planned for use as the audio codec.

See also
 H.261
 Vorbis
 Video compression
 Open Media Commons
 Dirac (codec)
 Theora
 Codec
 Open source codecs and containers

References

External links
 announcement of OMS Video
 Sun ponders video codec technology - InfoWorld
 OpenMediaCommons.org official homepage

Sun Microsystems
Free video codecs